The imperial election of June 9, 1198 was an imperial election held to select the emperor of the Holy Roman Empire.  It took place in Cologne. It was the second election during the Great German Throne Dispute, the election which made the Dispute official.

As a result of the election, Otto IV was named Holy Roman Emperor.

1199
1198 in the Holy Roman Empire
12th-century elections
Non-partisan elections
Otto IV, Holy Roman Emperor